= Jeff Strnad =

American lawyer

Jeff Strnad is an American lawyer, currently serving as the Charles A. Beardsley Professor of Law at Stanford Law School.

== Education ==
- BA Harvard University 1975
- JD Yale Law School 1979
- PhD (economics) Yale University Graduate School of Arts and Sciences 1982
